The Avril Robarts Library (formerly the Avril Robarts Learning Resource Centre (LRC)) is one of the two designated libraries belonging to Liverpool John Moores University (LJMU) in Liverpool, England. It stands at 79 Tithebarn Street and serves the City Campus located mostly on Byrom Street.

Its award-winning, Tithebarn building was designed by architects Austin-Smith:Lord, and built in 1997.  To its front, is the Superlambanana, an iconic sculpture of Liverpool. The building is alternatively known locally by students as, the Tithebarn (after the building) or (Super)lambanana building (after the statue in front).

The four-storey building contains 308 personal computers alongside countless books and online catalogues that cater mainly to the students of the Faculties of Science, Engineering and Technology and Education, Health and Community. Wi-Fi is available throughout the complex, which can be entered by scanning a relevant student ID card by the ground floor turnstiles. Other services available include research and learner support, IT Support, Skills@LJMU, welfare and counselling and employability advice.

It is a member of the Libraries Together: Liverpool Learning Partnership (evolved from Liverpool Libraries Group) which formed in 1990. Under which, a registered reader at any of the member libraries can have access rights to the other libraries within the partnership.

History 
In the 1990s, LJMU embarked on an initiative of improving the study spaces and libraries for its students. The first library constructed through this initiative was the Aldham Robarts Library, on Maryland Street, serving LJMU's Mount Pleasant Campus. The library was described to be a great success for the university and its students, leading to the decision to construct another LRC near LJMU's City Campus, with the initial proposal made in early 1992, and after governors considered the financing of the project, the LRC's relationship with the capital development programme, and the estates strategy, the proposal was clarified in the Strategic Plan 1992‐1996 (Liverpool John Moores University, 1993).

Planning

Existing libraries 
The, then Avril Robarts Learning Resource Centre was intended to replace two existing LJMU libraries in the area, which were deemed too close to teaching areas.

The Humanities Library, covering , served the Division of Education, Health and Social Sciences. The library only contained 16 PCs for student use within the library itself, with additional 106 PCs located in the computer rooms on the floor below. This limited capacity, followed by a growth in LJMU's student numbers, put increased pressure on the library, leading into a search for possible solutions, which ultimately was decided to be a new library.

The other LRC, Avril Robarts replaced, was the engineering and science "library", containing 110 PCs in a mix of two teaching rooms and an open space area. It occupied the second and third floors of the James Parsons Building, on Byrom Street.

Alternatives considered 
Earlier proposals for constructing a new LRC included a  building alongside a Technology Transfer Centre (TTC), the latter was later built as the Peter Jost Enterprise Centre, on Byrom Street. With Austin‐Smith: Lord being the building's architect. However, the LRC aspect in a building on Byrom Street failed to materialize.

Another site considered was the area adjacent to Trueman Street, near the Henry Cotton Building, but space in these sites at the time was either unavailable or too expensive.

Tithebarn Street 
After the other proposals were discarded, the idea of developing the LRC adjacent to the former College of Commerce, located between Tithebarn Street and Smithfield Street, which had been part of the original polytechnic in 1970, had been put forward. The nearby car park, located next to the building, on the intersection of Tithebarn Street, and Vauxhall Road, was considered. The site provided a reasonable area, the original proposals asked for 7,400m2 of space, however, to reduce costs, a 5,500m2 site was ultimately decided, with the university retaining the use of computing suites on the Trueman Street site, and the second floor of the James Parsons Building, to make up for the smaller LRC.

Concerns following the decision were expressed, most notably the distance of the LRC from Byrom Street, with the distance being a 10-minute walk from first floor to first floor. Although these issues can be minimised in multiple ways, such as block timetabling, which gave students the possibility of having complete half days free, allowing students the use of the LRC without impacting their timetable or study time. This would lead to the LRC being used for more long-stay purposes, rather than a short stay to return materials or check references, a student would stay longer in the centre to make better use of the facility, leading to longer stay study becoming the norm. According to Revill, the attraction of a new building, hosting a larger capacity of 200 PCs, meant that the usage of the centre would be equal to the two libraries it replaces, with the usage of the centre expected to increase to about double a year after opening.

To improve connectivity between the LRC and Byrom Street, initiatives to install improved pedestrian crossings along the A59 Byrom Street dual-carriageway were followed through. Further proposals including the creation of a university square in front of the LRC, at the intersections of Tithebarn St, Vauxhall Rd, Hatton Garden and Great Crosshall St, a student dubbing as a "Harvard Square", were not followed through.

Development 
The architects Austin‐Smith:Lord, the mechanical and electrical consultants Ernest Griffith and Son, and quantity surveyor Gleeds, and structural engineers and planning supervisors Wright Mottershaw, were appointed for the project. A small design team was then later established, with the team visiting many other institutions at the time including: Thames Valley University, Anglian Polytechnic University, University of North London, Edge Hill College of Higher Education, and the Aytoun Library of Manchester Metropolitan University. 

The total budget for the project was set to £8,700,000 including, construction, professional fees, and acquisition of the site. Construction was under a management contract with John Mowlem Construction plc. Wright Mottershaw were the planning supervisors for the project under the construction (design and management) regulations. The client for the contract was JMU Learning Resource Development Ltd.

Naming 
The building is named after Avril Robarts, the wife of Aldham Robarts, a businessman and the benefactor for the first LRC, who has made a significant contribution towards the costs of the second LRC. Local students commonly refer to the library by other unofficial names, such as the Tithebarn building (or simply Tithebarn), or the (Super)lambanana building.

Refurbishment 
Completed in 2020, the Avril Robarts Library underwent a complete refurbishment, with the 2nd & 3rd floors refurbished first, opening in early 2020, and the remaining ground & 1st floor reopening in October 2020.

The project consisted of the refurbishment and alteration of the university facilities in the building to provide internet café facilities, offices, reception and meeting areas. The construction and development of the refurbishment was conducted by Whitfield Brown Ltd and Willmott Dixon Construction, and the architect for the project was Weightman & Bullen. The project's value was £310,000, over a 33 week contract period.

The works aim to make the Avril Robarts Library, a modern environment for online, physical, and digital resources, host new study and social spaces and contain more visible spaces for key student support teams.

The refurbishment was carried out in three phases with overall completion in late 2020. The library refurbishment is part of the wider Tithebarn Building project by LJMU, which also involved the extension and enhancement of the nearby School of Nursing and Allied Health in an extension of the Tithebarn Building.

The refurbishment and wider Tithebarn Building project was part of LJMU’s estates masterplan, which involves the construction of a Student Life Building and Sports Building on Copperas Hill, a Pavilion at Aldham Robarts Library and a School of Education building on Maryland Street. The latter two within the existing Mount Pleasant Campus, the Copperas Hill site is located adjacent to Mount Pleasant and Liverpool Lime Street station.

Building 
The Avril Robarts Library is housed within the Tithebarn Building. The building is curved with a  radius, covered with a long brick and glass facade, which rounds the curve from Tithebarn Street to Vauxhall Road. The curved structure is made of a steel frame on piled foundations. The large amount of windows aim to lighten the internal space of the building providing a calm environment for students, ideal for learning and studying. The building also hosts the university's School of Health, a 200‐seat Stanton Fuller lecture theatre, and a cafe.

General information

Location 
Avril Robarts Library is at 79 Tithebarn Street in Liverpool, L2 2ER (England). The library supports the:

Faculty of Engineering and Technology, which includes the following departments:

 Astrophysics Research Institute
 Centre for Entrepreneurship
 Department of Applied Mathematics
 Department of the Built Environment
 Department of Civil Engineering
 Department of Computer Science
 Department of Electronics and Electrical Engineering
 Department of Maritime and Mechanical Engineering
 Engineering and Technology Research Institute
 LJMU Maritime Centre

Faculty of Science, which includes the following schools:

 School of Natural Sciences and PsychologyHumanities and Social Science
 School of Pharmacy and Biomolecular Sciences
 School of Sport and Exercise Sciences

Opening Times 
, during term times, the library is staffed between the times of:

 8: 45 am - 11 pm Monday to Friday
 10 am - 8 pm Saturday and Sunday

During non-term times, the library is staffed between the times of:

 8:45 am - 7 pm Monday to Friday
 10 am - 4 pm Saturday 

Students must have their ID cards to access the building (by-passing turnstiles) and accessing id-locked services.

See also
 Aldham Robarts Library
 Former IM Marsh Library

Notes

References

External links
 Liverpool JMU libraries webpage

Library buildings completed in 1997
Public libraries in Merseyside
Academic libraries in England
Buildings and structures in Liverpool
Liverpool John Moores University
Libraries in Liverpool